The Piute ground squirrel (Urocitellus mollis) is a species of rodent in the family Sciuridae. It is endemic to the Great Basin region of the western United States, where it is found in parts of California, Idaho, Nevada, Oregon, Utah, and Washington.

References

Urocitellus
Endemic fauna of the United States
Fauna of the Northwestern United States
Fauna of the Southwestern United States
Fauna of the Great Basin
Mammals of the United States
Mammals described in 1863
Taxonomy articles created by Polbot
Taxa named by Robert Kennicott